Dayere Zangi ( Tambourine) (romanized: Dayereh-e zangi) is a 2008 Iranian comedy drama film directed by Parisa Bakhtavar and written by Asghar Farhadi. It was released in Iran during the Nowrooz holidays and was an average gross.

Story
Shirin (Baran Kowsari), a young woman, has only one day to make a lot of money fast, in order to repair her father's car she damaged in an accident. She befriends a naive, young man named Mohammad (Saber Abar) who tries to help her to raise the money by entering an apartment building and installing illegal satellite dishes for the diverse residents with diverging views on media — when they get into further trouble.

Cast 
 Baran Kowsari
 Saber Abar
 Mehran Modiri
 Mohammad Reza Sharifinia
 Hamed BehdadAmin Hayai
 Bahareh Rahnama
 Omid Rohani
 Gohar Kheirandish
 Nima Shahrokh Shahi
 NiloofarKhoshkholgh
 Negar Foroozandeh
 Akram Mohammadi
 Amir Noori
 Mahdi Pakdel
 Afarin Chitsaz
 Sarina Farhadi
 Soroosh Goodarzi
 Kianoosh Gerami
 Mohsen Ghazi Moradi
 Melika Sharifinia

References

External links
 

Iranian comedy-drama films
2008 films
2000s Persian-language films